Greg McHugh (born 5 January 1980) is a Scottish actor. He is the creator, writer and star of the BBC1 comedy series Gary: Tank Commander. He also played Howard in the Channel 4 comedy Fresh Meat.

Early life and education
Greg McHugh was born in Morningside, Edinburgh, on 5 January 1980. His father was a civil servant, and his mother a teacher. McHugh has two elder brothers.

McHugh attended St Peter's RC primary school and then St Thomas of Aquin's High School. He studied business at the University of Stirling and trained at the Royal Scottish Academy of Music and Drama in Glasgow. Initially, McHugh had intended to study sports science but found it too difficult.

McHugh's native accent is a softer variation of the Edinburgh accent.

Career
McHugh can be seen briefly on screen in the Still Game episode "Faimly" as a friend or relative visiting the patient in the bed beside Winston Ingram.

McHugh played Josh Elvey in the TV movie Not Safe for Work.

In 2010, McHugh appeared in the episode "Don the Musical" of the English sitcom How Not to Live Your Life. He played Randy, a local actor of amateur dramatics who played the Tom Cruise character, Charlie Babbitt, in a musical version of Rain Man. He was in two 2010 episodes of Rab C. Nesbitt as Liam O'Hagan. The episodes were "Muse" and "Candy."

McHugh appeared on Red Nose Day 2011 reporting the fund-raising going on throughout Scotland for Comic Relief.

McHugh was nominated for a Scottish BAFTA as writer of Gary: Tank Commander.

Between 2011 & 2016, McHugh starred as Howard in the Channel 4 comedy Fresh Meat.

In 2013, McHugh appeared in the Channel 4 serial Dates.

McHugh appeared in the 2013 Bad Education Christmas special as Bonehead, a homeless man.

In 2014, McHugh appeared in the BBC film Marvellous playing the part of Malcolm, the long-time friend of Neil Baldwin.

From 6 December 2014 to 11 January 2015, McHugh starred as the character of Smee in the pantomime production of Peter Pan at the King's Theatre, Glasgow.

In 2016, 2017 & 2020, he appeared as Eddie Scott in the Cumbria-based BBC1 drama The A Word.

On 21 September 2016, McHugh made a secret guest appearance at the first "Andy Murray Live" event, a charity tennis exhibition event raising funds for UNICEF and the Glasgow-based charity, Young People’s Futures.

From 20–22 October 2016, he reprised his role as Gary: Tank Commander in a stage version of the sitcom at The Hydro in Glasgow.

In 2022, Mchugh appeared with an interview appearance on the critically acclaimed ‘Chatabix’ podcast.

Personal life
McHugh lives in Hove, East Sussex, with his wife Katie. The couple have two children.

Filmography

Theatre

References

External links

Living people
People educated at St Thomas of Aquin's High School
Alumni of the University of Stirling
Alumni of the Royal Conservatoire of Scotland
Scottish comedy writers
Scottish male stage actors
Scottish male television actors
1980 births
British male comedy actors
21st-century Scottish male actors
Male actors from Edinburgh